The Alexandra River is a tributary of the North Saskatchewan River in Alberta, Canada. From there it flows for about  through a remote valley until it reaches its mouth at the North Saskatchewan River.

A decommissioned Parks Canada access road follows the north bank upstream until the river's confluence with the Castleguard River, allowing foot access to the Castleguard Meadows, a revered but seldom-visited hiking destination. The trail is no longer maintained and most bridges have decayed or been removed, making the two days of travel to the meadows very challenging. In addition, Castleguard Cave is accessible from the upper reaches of the trail.

Other major tributaries of the river include Ridges Creek, Terrace Creek, and Amery Creek.

See also 
 List of rivers of Alberta

References 

Rivers of Alberta
Banff National Park
North Saskatchewan River